Llanllechid is a village near Bethesda and a community in Gwynedd, Wales with a population of 889 as of the 2011 UK census and an area of . The community also includes Tal-y-Bont near Bangor, Gwynedd and a large part of the Carneddau range so is therefore sparsely populated.

Eglwys St Llechid, Llanllechid
St Llechid is the patron saint of the village, where she founded the parish church and a holy well (now lost). The church closed in 2002.

Notable people 
 John Francon Williams (1854–1911), writer, geographer, cartographer, journalist, editor, historian, inventor; born and grew up in Llanllechid.
 Elias Owen (1863–1888), a Welsh amateur football goalkeeper with three caps for Wales.
 Brenda Chamberlain (1912–1971), artist.
 Thomas Edwards orientalist, was born in Llanllechid in 1652. 
 Gruff Rhys (born 1970), musician and member of Super Furry Animals.
 Margaret Thomas (born 1779), musician and hymn writer.
 Edward Stephen Welsh minister, musician, singer and composer. During the time he was minister of a chapel in Llanllechid he wrote a requiem in memory of John Jones, Talysarn.
 Thomas Bayley Hughes, Archdeacon of Bangor, (1983–1986) held an incumbency at Llanllechid.
 Evan Evans 18th c. poet and priest, held a curate at Llanllechid.
 Thomas Henry Wyatt was the architect of a church in Llanllechid circa 1855/6.
  John Petts 20th c. artist, and his wife  Brenda Chamberlain artist, set up home near Llanllechid where they also held two joint exhibitions.
 Griffith Williams 17th c. former Bishop, who after his suspension in 1612, preached in Llanllechid.

References

Llanllechid
Villages in Gwynedd
Communities in Gwynedd